The 2018 World Junior Short Track Speed Skating Championships took place from 2 to 4 March 2018 in Tomaszów Mazowiecki, Poland.

Medal summary

Medal table

Men's events
The results of the Championships:

Women's events
The results of the Championships:

Participating nations

See also
Short track speed skating
World Junior Short Track Speed Skating Championships

References

External links
 Official website
 Results book

World Junior Short Track Speed Skating Championships
World Junior Short Track Speed Skating Championships
World Junior Short Track Speed Skating Championships
International speed skating competitions hosted by Poland
Sport in Tomaszów Mazowiecki
World Junior Short Track Speed Skating Championships
World Junior Short Track Speed Skating Championships